Five Star Magazine is an annual publication and digital luxury magazine first published in Scotland in 2010. The magazine covers luxury travel, and luxury lifestyle targeting the super wealthy. The magazine is Glasgow based but has a global audience and has received a number of international awards since its first year of creation. Brazilian born and founder Renata Parolari Fernandes is still the editor.

See also
 List of magazines published in Scotland
 List of magazines in the United Kingdom

References

 Media Pioneer Awards: Five Star Magazine
 Digital Media Awards: Outstanding Achievement in Digital Media - Five Star Magazine
 Digital Magazine Awards: Luxury Travel Magazine of The Year, 2010 - Five Star Magazine
 Interior Summit- Five Star Magazine
 European Hospitality Awards

External links
Five Star Magazine's Official website

Magazines published in Scotland
Mass media in Glasgow
Annual magazines published in the United Kingdom
Lifestyle magazines published in the United Kingdom